Peter Crowley may refer to:
Peter Crowley (Gaelic footballer) (born 1990)
Peter Crowley (revolutionary) (1900–1963), participated in the longest hunger strike in history